Rok Elsner (born 25 January 1986) is a Slovenian professional footballer who plays as a defensive midfielder for Austrian club DSG Ferlach.

Personal life
His grandfather, Branko, and his father, Marko, were both footballers. His older brother, Luka, is a football manager and former player.

Honours
Interblock
 Slovenian Cup: 2007–08, 2008–09
 Slovenian Supercup: 2008

Śląsk Wrocław
 Ekstraklasa: 2011–12
 Polish Super Cup: 2012

Domžale
 Slovenian Cup: 2016–17

References

External links

PrvaLiga profile 
 

1986 births
Living people
Footballers from Ljubljana
Slovenian footballers
Slovenia youth international footballers
Slovenia under-21 international footballers
Association football midfielders
Slovenian expatriate footballers
OGC Nice players
SV Wehen Wiesbaden players
NK IB 1975 Ljubljana players
Al-Arabi SC (Kuwait) players
FK Haugesund players
Śląsk Wrocław players
Aris Thessaloniki F.C. players
FC Energie Cottbus players
Olimpia Grudziądz players
Hunan Billows players
NK Domžale players
FK Željezničar Sarajevo players
NK Triglav Kranj players
Regionalliga players
Slovenian PrvaLiga players
Kuwait Premier League players
Eliteserien players
Ekstraklasa players
Super League Greece players
3. Liga players
I liga players
China League One players
Premier League of Bosnia and Herzegovina players
Oman Professional League players
Expatriate footballers in France
Expatriate footballers in Germany
Expatriate footballers in Kuwait
Expatriate footballers in Norway
Expatriate footballers in Poland
Expatriate footballers in Greece
Expatriate footballers in China
Expatriate footballers in Bosnia and Herzegovina
Expatriate footballers in Oman
Expatriate footballers in Austria
Slovenian expatriate sportspeople in France
Slovenian expatriate sportspeople in Germany
Slovenian expatriate sportspeople in Kuwait
Slovenian expatriate sportspeople in Norway
Slovenian expatriate sportspeople in Poland
Slovenian expatriate sportspeople in Greece
Slovenian expatriate sportspeople in China
Slovenian expatriate sportspeople in Bosnia and Herzegovina
Slovenian expatriate sportspeople in Oman
Slovenian expatriate sportspeople in Austria
Elsner family